Abbas El Fassi (born 18 September 1940) was Moroccan politician and businessman, prime minister of Morocco from 19 September 2007 to 29 November 2011. El Fassi, a member of the Istiqlal Party, replaced independent Driss Jettou.

Early life and career
El Fassi was born in Berkane, Morocco, on 18 September 1940. He served as the Minister of Housing from 1977 to 1981, Minister of Handicraft and Social Affairs from 1981 to 1985, ambassador to Tunisia and the Arab League from 1985 to 1990, ambassador to France from 1990 to 1994, and as Minister of Employment, Professional Training, Social Development and Solidarity from 2000 to 2002. He then took up the post of Minister of State in the Jettou government from 2002 to 2007. King Mohammed VI appointed El Fassi as prime minister on 19 September 2007 following Istiqlal's victory in the parliamentary elections on 7 September.

His government was appointed by Mohammed VI on 15 October 2007 with 33 members (not including El Fassi), including seven women. Five political parties were included in this government: Istiqlal, liberal Mouvement Populaire (MP), the Socialist Union of Popular Forces (USFP), the National Rally of Independents (RNI), and the Party of Progress and Socialism (PPS).

Controversies
Abbas el Fassi was Moroccan ambassador to France when Gilles Perrault's political pamphlet "Notre ami, le roi", about human rights abuses in Morocco, was published in France. Ties between Morocco and France deteriorated with the publication of the book.

References

1940 births
Living people
Government ministers of Morocco
Istiqlal Party politicians
People from Berkane
Prime Ministers of Morocco
20th-century Moroccan lawyers
Ambassadors of Morocco to France
Ambassadors of Morocco to Tunisia
Ambassadors of Morocco to the Arab League